The Paenitentiale Ecgberhti (also known as the Paenitentiale Pseudo-Ecgberhti, or more commonly as either Ecgberht's penitential or the Ecgberhtine penitential) is an early medieval penitential handbook composed around 740, possibly by Archbishop Ecgberht of York.

This work should not be confused with the vernacular works known as the Old English Penitential (formerly the Paenitentiale Pseudo-Ecgberhti) and the Scriftboc (formerly the Confessionale Pseudo-Ecgberhti).

Background

Authorship

Sources

Manuscripts and Transmission
There are eleven extant manuscripts that contain the Paenitentiale Ecgberhti, dating from as early as the end of the eighth century to as late as the thirteenth, ranging geographically from southern Germany to Brittany to England. The sigla given below (V6, O1, etc.) are based on those established by the Körntgen–Kottje Editionsprojekt for the Corpus Christianorum, Series Latina, vol. 156, a project whose goal is to produce scholarly editions for all major early medieval penitentials; sigla in parentheses are those used by Reinhard Haggenmüller in his 1991 study.
 
Haggenmüller divided these eleven surviving witnesses of the Paenitentiale Ecgberhti into three groups, based broadly on the regions in which they were produced, the nature and arrangement of their accompanying texts, and shared readings in the Paenitentiale Ecgberhti itself. The 'Norman' group consists of some of the youngest manuscripts (P22, O5, C2, O1), most of which originated in regions under Norman influence or control, namely tenth-century Brittany and eleventh to twelfth-century England; only O5 originates in a non-Norman context. The 'South-German' group (Se1, Sg10, V4, M17) represents a textual tradition emanating from a region in southern Germany (perhaps the Lake Constance area), even though only one constituent witness (Sg10) originates in a South-German centre. Haggenmüller's third group, the 'Lorsch' group, includes three manuscripts (V6, W9, V5), two of which (V6, W9) are the oldest extant witnesses to the Paenitentiale Ecgberhti tradition. Of the three manuscripts in this group, however, only one (V5) is known with certainty to have been produced at Lorsch (though V6 had provenance there by the first half of the ninth century). It is currently unknown where the two earliest witnesses of the Paenitentiale Ecgberhti (V6, W9) originate from, though it was likely not in the same place since they present rather different versions of the text.

In addition to the eleven main witnesses listed above, the prologue to the Paenitentiale Ecgberhti is also transmitted in the following manuscripts:
Oxford, Bodleian Library, Bodley 572 (2026), fols 51–106 (written first third of ninth century in northern France), at fols 88r–90r as part of a series of penitential and canonical texts that perhaps once stood as an appendix to the Collectio canonum vetus Gallica.
Paris, Bibliothèque nationale, Lat. 10575 (written between ca 950 and 1000 in England), at fols 3r–6v as the introductory text to the Pontificale Pseudo-Ecgberhti.
Paris, Bibliothèque nationale, lat. 943 (written ca 1000 to 1050 in Sherborne), at fols 147v–149r (with Ghaerbald's Capitula episcoporum I appended) as part of the so-called ‘Dunstan’ pontifical.
Rouen, Bibliothèque municipale, MS 368 (A. 27) (written first half of eleventh century in Cornwall)], at fols 176v–178v (with Ghaerbald's Capitula episcoporum I appended) as part of the so-called the ‘Lanalet’ pontifical.
Rouen, Bibliothèque municipale, MS 1382 (U. 109), fols 173r–198v (written first half of eleventh century in southern England), at fols 196v–198v (with Ghaerbald's Capitula episcoporum I appended) as the final text in the (incomplete) R recension of Wulfstan's Collectio canonum Wigorniensis

The Paenitentiale Ecgberhti is also transmitted in somewhat altered form as part of two later penitential texts known as the Vorstufe des Paenitentiale additivum Pseudo-Bedae–Ecgberhti (or Preliminary Stage of the Unified Bedan-Ecgberhtine Penitential, in which the Paenitentiale Ecgberhti is affixed to the end of the Paenitentiale Bedae) and the Paenitentiale additivum Pseudo-Bedae–Ecgberhti (or Unified Bedan-Ecgberhtine Penitential; like the Preliminary Stage, but the whole is now preceded by the prefaces of both the Paenitentiale Bedae and the Paenitentiale Ecgberhti), and in greatly altered form in the still later Paenitentiale mixtum Pseudo-Bedae–Ecgberhti (or Merged Bedan-Ecgberhtine Penitential, in which the chapters of both the Paenitentiale Bedae and the Paenitentiale Ecgberhti are mixed together and arranged by topic).

Reception

Editions
The Paenitentiale Ecgberhti itself has been edited twice and reprinted once:
F.W.H. Wasserschleben, ed., Die Bussordnungen der abendländischen Kirche (Halle, 1851), pp. 231–46, printing from W9.
W. Stubbs with A.W. Haddan, eds, Councils and ecclesiastical documents relating to Great Britain and Ireland, vol. 3 (Oxford, 1873), pp. 416–31, reprinting Wasserschleben's edition of W9, with variant readings from O5 and (for the prologue only) from Paris, Bibliothèque nationale, Lat. 10575 as printed by W. Greenwell, ed., The pontifical of Egbert, Archbishop of York, A.D. 732–766, Publications of the Surtees Society 27 (Durham, 1853).
H.J. Schmitz, ed., Die Bussbücher und das kanonische Bussverfahren, nach handschriftlichen Quellen dargestellt (Düsseldorf, 1898), pp. 661–74, printing from V5, with variant readings from V6 and W9. This edition is currently standard.

Much more numerous are editions of the Paenitentiale Ecgberhti in the later modified forms mentioned above, namely the Vorstufe des Paenitentiale additivum Pseudo-Bedae–Ecgberhti, the Paenitentiale additivum Pseudo-Bedae–Ecgberhti, and the Paenitentiale mixtum Pseudo-Bedae–Ecgberhti. These works, which present the Paenitentiale Ecgberhti material in sometimes greatly modified form, have been edited and reprinted many times since the early modern period.

The Vorstufe des Paenitentiale additivum Pseudo-Bedae–Ecgberhti has been edited four times:
E. Martène and U. Durand, eds, Veterum scriptorum et monumentorum historicorum, dogmaticorum, moralium, amplissima collectio ..., 9 vols (Paris 1724–1733), vol. VII, cols 37–49, printing from a now lost St-Hubert manuscript.
H.J. Schmitz, ed., Die Bussbücher und die Bussdisciplin der Kirche, nach handschriftlichen Quellen dargestellt (Mainz, 1883), pp. 573–87, printing an incomplete text of the Vorstufe from Munich, Bayerische Staatsbibliothek, Clm 12673, with variant readings from the V6 text of the Paenitentiale Ecgberhti.
H.J. Schmitz, ed., Die Bussbücher und die Bussdisciplin der Kirche, nach handschriftlichen Quellen dargestellt (Mainz, 1883), pp. 556–64 printing an incomplete text of the Vorstufe from Munich, Bayerische Staatsbibliothek, Clm 12673 (up to c. 5.11).
H.J. Schmitz, ed., Die Bussbücher und das kanonische Bussverfahren, nach handschriftlichen Quellen dargestellt (Düsseldorf, 1898), pp. 654–59, printing the Sonderrezension der Vorstufe des Paenitentiale additivum Pseudo-Bedae–Ecgberhti from V4.

The Paenitentiale additivum Pseudo-Bedae–Ecgberhti has been edited three times and reprinted nine times:
J. Heerwag, ed., Opera Bedae Venerabilis ... omnia in octo tomos distincta ... (Basel, 1563), VIII, cols 1127–34, printing from a now lost manuscript.
A. Augustín, ed., Canones paenitentiales quibus ordine succedunt ... (Tarragona, 1581), pp. 107–19, reprinting Heerwag.
G. Rocchi, ed., Antonii Augustini Archiepiscopi Tarraconensis opera omnia ..., 8 vols (Luca, 1765–1774), III, pp. 298–308, reprinting Augustín.
H. Spelman, with J. Stephens and J. Spelman, eds, Concilia, decreta, leges, constitutiones in re ecclesiarum orbis Britannici ... ab initio christianæ ibidem religionis, ad nostram usque ætatem ... Tom. I: ... a primis Christi seculis usque ad introitum Normannorum ... (London, 1639), pp. 281–88, reprinting Heerwag.
Conciliorum omnium generalium et provincialium collectio regia, 37 vols (Paris, 1644), XVII, pp. 517–29, reprinting Spelman.
P. Labbè and G. Cossart, eds, Sacrosancta concilia ad regiam editionem exacta quæ nunc quarta parte prodit auctior, 16 vols (Paris, 1671–1672), VI, cols 1611–1619, reprinting the Collectio regia.
N. Coleti, ed. Sacrosancta concilia ad regiam editionem exacta, quæ olim quarta parte prodit auctior studio Philip. Labbei, & Gabr. Cossartii ..., 23 vols (Venice, 1728–1733), VIII, cols 359–366, reprinting Labbè–Cossart.
G.D. Mansi, ed., Sacrorum conciliorum nova et amplissima collectio ..., 31 vols (Florence, 1759–1798; repr. with 22 additional volumes containing supplementary material, Paris and Leipzig, 1901–1927), XII, cols 489–498, reprinting Labbè–Cossart.
J.-P. Migne, ed., Patrologiæ cursus completus sive bibliotheca universalis ... omnium SS. patrum, doctorum scriptorumque ecclesiasticorum qui ab ævo apostoloca ad usque Innocentii III tempora floruerunt ... series secunda (= Latina) ..., 217 vols, (Paris, 1844–1864), LXXXIX, cols 443–454, reprinting Mansi.
J.-P. Migne, ed., Patrologiæ cursus completus sive bibliotheca universalis ... omnium SS. patrum, doctorum scriptorumque ecclesiasticorum qui ab ævo apostoloca ad usque Innocentii III tempora floruerunt ... series secunda (= Latina) ..., 217 vols, (Paris, 1844–1864), XCIV, cols 567–675, reprinting ???.
J. Morin, ed., Commentarius historicus de disciplina in administratione sacramenti poenitentiæ tredecim primis seculis in ecclesia occidentali ... (Paris, 1651), Appendix, pp. 32–6, printing from a now lost Saint-Hubert manuscript.
B. Albers, "Wann sind die Beda-Egbert’schen Bussbücher verfaßt worden, und wer ist ihr Verfasser?", Archiv für katholisches Kirchenrecht 81 (1901), pp. 393–420.

The Paenitentiale mixtum Pseudo-Bedae–Ecgberhti has been edited twice and reprinted twice:
F.W.H. Wasserschleben, Beitraege zur Geschichte der vorgratianischen Kirchenrechtsquellen, (Leipzig, 1839), pp. 126–45, printing from Cologne, Erzbischöfliche Diözesan- und Dombibliothek, Codex 118.
F. Kunstmann, ed., Die Lateinischen Pönitentialbücher der Angelsachsen, mit geschichtlicher Einleitung, (Mainz, 1844), pp. 142–75, printing from Munich, Bayerische Staatsbibliothek, Clm 3851 and Munich, Bayerische Staatsbibliothek, Clm 3853.
F.W.H. Wasserschleben, ed., Die Bussordnungen der abendländischen Kirche (Halle, 1851), pp. 248–83, reprinting Kunstmann's edition of the Paenitentiale mixtum Pseudo-Bedae–Ecgberhti.
H.J. Schmitz, ed., Die Bussbücher und das kanonische Bussverfahren, nach handschriftlichen Quellen dargestellt (Düsseldorf, 1898), pp. 679–701, reprinting Kunstmann's edition of the Paenitentiale mixtum Pseudo-Bedae–Ecgberhti.

Notes

External links
 Elliot's edition (in progress) of the Paenitentiale Ecgberthi, based on Pal. lat. 554 (Anglo-Saxon Canon Law Website)
 Transcription of the Paenitentiale Ecgberhti from Pal. lat. 554 (Anglo-Saxon Canon Law Website)
 Transcription of the Paenitentiale Ecgberhti from Bodley 718 (Anglo-Saxon Canon Law Website)
 Wasserschleben's 1851 edition of the Paenitentiale Ecgberhti (Google Books)
 Stubbs's 1873 reprint of Wasserschleben's edition of the Paenitentiale Ecgberhti (Google Books)
 Schmitz's 1898 edition of the Paenitentiale Ecgberhti (Internet Archive)
 Martène–Durand's 1733 edition of the Vorstufe des Paenitentiale additivum Pseudo-Bedae–Ecgberhti (Google Books)
 Schmitz's 1883 edition of the Vorstufe des Paenitentiale additivum Pseudo-Bedae–Ecgberhti (Google Books)
 Schmitz's 1883 (incomplete) edition of the Vorstufe des Paenitentiale additivum Pseudo-Bedae–Ecgberhti (Google Books)
 Schmitz's 1898 edition of the Sonderrezension der Vorstufe des Paenitentiale additivum Pseudo-Bedae–Ecgberhti (Internet Archive)
 Augustín's 1581 reprint of Heerwag's edition of the Paenitentiale additivum Pseudo-Bedae–Ecgberhti  (Google Books)
 Rocchi's 1767 reprint of Augustín's reprint of the Paenitentiale additivum Pseudo-Bedae–Ecgberhti  (Google Books)
 Spelman's 1639 reprint of Heerwag's edition of the Paenitentiale additivum Pseudo-Bedae–Ecgberhti (Google Books)
 Labbè–Cossart's 1671 reprint of Spelman's reprint of the Paenitentiale additivum Pseudo-Bedae–Ecgberhti (Google Books)
 Coleti's 1729 reprint of Labbè–Cossart's reprint of the Paenitentiale additivum Pseudo-Bedae–Ecgberhti (Google Books)
 Mansi's 1766 reprint of Labbè–Cossart's reprint of the Paenitentiale additivum Pseudo-Bedae–Ecgberhti (Gallica)
 Migne's 1850 reprint of Mansi's reprint of the Paenitentiale additivum Pseudo-Bedae–Ecgberhti (Google Books)
 Morin's 1651 edition of the Paenitentiale additivum Pseudo-Bedae–Ecgberhti  (Google Books)
 Wasserschleben's 1839 edition of the Paenitentiale mixtum Pseudo-Bedae–Ecgberhti (Google Books)
 Kunstmann's 1844 edition of the Paenitentiale mixtum Pseudo-Bedae–Ecgberhti (Google Books)
 Wasserschleben's 1851 reprint of Kunstmann's edition of the Paenitentiale mixtum Pseudo-Bedae–Ecgberhti (Google Books)
 Schmitz's 1898 reprint of Kunstmann's edition of the Paenitentiale mixtum Pseudo-Bedae–Ecgberhti (Internet Archive)

Bibliography
Reinhold Haggenmüller, Die Überlieferung der Beda und Egbert zugeschriebenen Bussbücher, Europäische Hochschulschriften. Reihe III, Geschichte und ihre Hilfswissenschaften 461 (Frankfurt am Main, 1991).

Penitentials
8th-century Latin books